Yunker Aircraft Company was an American aircraft manufacturer of the late 1920s

George C. Yunker, was head of a tractor agency in Dodge City, Kansas. He founded the Yunker Aircraft company in Wichita, hiring W.E. Laird as production manager. The company contracted Knoll Aircraft Company to produce some models. The company went into receivership to C.V. Snyder in 1930 with $230 owed in labor.

Aircraft

References

Aviation in Kansas